Tammy Pescatelli (born Tammy Gillespie) is an American stand-up comedian.

Life and career
Pescatelli was born in Perry, Ohio, and spent her childhood summers in her mother's hometown of Meadville, Pennsylvania. Pescatelli worked as a morning radio show co-host, performer, TV spokeswoman and basketball cheerleader from 1990 to 1995 in the Quad Cities area of southeastern Iowa and northwestern Illinois. Pescatelli's comedic career took off after appearing on NBC's Last Comic Standing in 2004.

Pescatelli married Luca Palanca on February 11, 2008. Palanca and Pescatelli moved to Meadville in 2009 after their son was born. Both Pescatelli and Palanca are of Italian descent, and her extended family lives in Meadville. She is often on the road as a stand-up comedian, so in Meadville her extended family helps look after their son. Part of her show's humor originates from the interactions with her and her husband's families.

In 2010, Pescatelli won Comedy Central's Standup Showdown. In 2004, she was a finalist on the second and third seasons of Last Comic Standing.  She was one of the Final Five on NBC‘s Last Comic Standing.

Pescatelli co-created, executive produced, wrote and starred in a reality television show on WE tv called A Standup Mother (2011), related to Pescatelli's life as a mother, wife, and comedian.

Her comedy special Finding the Funny was released with Netflix in 2013. It was selected "New and Noteworthy" by iTunes editors and hit number 3 on the charts.

She was chosen four years in a row to be included in The New York Post greatest jokes from the past year.

In 2011, Pescatelli was diagnosed with stage 2 ovarian cancer. She underwent surgery, was told she was "free and clear" of cancer and did not have to go through chemotherapy.

References

External links 
 
 

American people of Italian descent
People from Perry, Ohio
Last Comic Standing contestants
Living people
American television actresses
American film actresses
21st-century American comedians
1969 births
21st-century American actresses